Bernard Patrick Baxter (15 June 1929 – 27 December 2012) was a former Australian rules footballer in the Victorian Football League (VFL).

His brother, Ken Baxter, also played with Carlton.

References

External links

 Bernie Baxter at Blueseum

Carlton Football Club players
Australian rules footballers from Melbourne
1929 births
2012 deaths
People from Werribee, Victoria